Weston-super-Mare by-election may refer to:

 1934 Weston-super-Mare by-election
 1958 Weston-super-Mare by-election
 1969 Weston-super-Mare by-election